Arumai Magal Abirami is a 1959 Indian Tamil-language film directed by V. Krishnan. The film stars Prem Nazir and Rajasulochana. It was released on 29 November 1959.

Plot

Cast 
The following list is adapted for the database of Film News Anandan

Male cast
Prem Nazir
S. V. Sahasranamam
T. S. Durairaj
Thevar
Muthaiah

Female cast
Rajasulochana
Rajeswari
Jayanthi
Kamala
Malathi
Muthulakshmi
Suryakala

Production 
The film was produced by V. Krishnan and S. V. Shanmugasundaram under the banner Aravind Pictures and was directed by V. Krishnan. The story was written by V. Krishnan and K. Ramachandran while the dialogues were penned by V. Kalaimani. C. Rajagopal handled the photography and the editing was done by G. Venkataraman. Art direction was by Chellaiah. Vembatti Sathyam, Rajkumar and P. S. Gopalakrishnan were in charge of choreography. Still photography was done by B. V. Venkatachalam and the film was processed at AVM laboratory.

Soundtrack 
Music was composed by V. Dakshinamoorthy while the lyrics were penned by A. Maruthakasi, Ku. Sa. Krishnamoorthi, Clown Sundaram, Kuyilan, Lakshmanadas, Thanjai N. Ramaiah Dass and A. S. Narayanan.

References

External links 
 

1950s Tamil-language films
Films scored by V. Dakshinamoorthy